The 6th Justice and Development Party Ordinary Congress took place on 18 August 2018 in order to elect a party leader and members to the party congress of Turkey's ruling Justice and Development Party (AKP).

References

2018 elections in Turkey
Justice and Development Party (Turkey)
August 2018 events in Turkey